Khagan or Qaghan (Mongolian:;  or Khagan) is a title of imperial rank in the Turkic, Mongolic and some other languages, equal to the status of emperor and someone who rules a khaganate (empire). The female equivalent is Khatun.

It may also be translated as "Khan of Khans", equivalent to King of Kings. In Bulgarian, the title became known as Khan, while in modern Turkic, the title became Khaan with the g sound becoming almost silent or non-existent; the ğ in modern Turkish Kağan is also silent. Since the division of the Mongol Empire, monarchs of the Yuan dynasty and the Northern Yuan held the title of Khagan. Kağan, Hakan and Kaan, Turkish equivalents of the title are common Turkish names in Turkey.

The common western rendering as Great Khan (or Grand Khan), notably in the case of the Mongol Empire, is a translation of Yekhe Khagan (Great Emperor or ).

Etymology 
The term is of unknown origin and possibly a loanword from the Ruanruan language. According to Vovin (2007, 2010) the term comes from qaγan (meaning "emperor" or "supreme ruler") and was later borrowed and used in several languages, especially in Turkic and Mongolic.

Turkic and Para-Mongolic origin has been suggested by a number of scholars including Ramstedt, Shiratori, Pulleyblank, Sinor and Doerfer, and was reportedly first used by the Xianbei, as recorded in Book of Song. While Sinor believes qaγan or qapγan is an intensification of qan just as qap-qara is an intensification of qara "black", in Turkic (with the eventual loss of the p), Shiratori rejects a Turkic etymology, instead supporting a Mongolic origin for both qan and the female form qatun.

According to Vovin, the word *qa-qan "great-qan" (*qa- for "great" or "supreme") is of non-Altaic origin, but instead linked to Yeniseian *qεʔ ~ qaʔ "big, great". The origin of qan itself is harder according to Vovin. He says that the origin for the word qan is not found in any reconstructed proto-language and was used widely by Turkic, Mongolic, Chinese and Korean people with variations from kan, qan, han and hwan. A relation exists possibly to the Yeniseian words *qʌ:j or *χʌ:j meaning "ruler". 

It may be impossible to prove the ultimate origin of the title, but Vovin says: "Thus, it seems to be quite likely that the ultimate source of both qaγan and qan can be traced back to Xiong-nu and Yeniseian".

Dybo (2007) suggests that the ultimate etymological root of Khagan comes from the Middle Iranian *hva-kama- ‘self-ruler, emperor’, following the view of Benveniste 1966. Savelyev and Jeong 2020 note that both the etymological root for Khagan and its female equivalent Khatun may be derived from Eastern Iranian languages, specifically from "Early Saka *hvatuñ, cf. the attested Soghdian words xwt'w ‘ruler’ (< *hva-tāvya-) and xwt'yn ‘wife of the ruler’ (< *hva-tāvyani)".

History
The title was first seen in a speech between 283 and 289, when the Xianbei chief Tuyuhun tried to escape from his younger stepbrother Murong Hui, and began his route from the Liaodong Peninsula to the areas of Ordos Desert. In the speech one of Murong's generals, Yinalou, addressed him as kehan (later ); some sources suggests that Tuyuhun might also have used the title after settling at Qinghai Lake in the 3rd century.

The Rouran Khaganate (330–555) was the first people to use the titles Khagan and Khan for their emperors, replacing the Chanyu of the Xiongnu, whom Grousset and others assume to be Turkic. The Rourans were stated to be descendants of the Donghu people, who in turn are assumed to be proto-Mongols, Mongolic-speaking, or a "non-Altaic" group.

The Avar Khaganate (567–804), who may have included Rouran elements after the Göktürks crushed the Rouran ruling Mongolia, also used this title. The Avars invaded Europe, and for over a century ruled the Carpathian region. Westerners Latinized the title "Khagan" into "Gaganus" (in Historia Francorum), "Cagan" (in the Annales Fuldenses), or "Cacano" (in the Historia Langobardorum).

Mongol khagans 

The Secret History of the Mongols, written for that very dynasty, clearly distinguishes Khagan and Khan: only Genghis Khan and his ruling descendants are called Khagan, while other rulers are referred to as Khan. The title "Khagan" or "Khaan" most literally translates to "great/supreme ruler" in the Mongol language, and by extension "sovereign", "monarch", "high king", or "emperor". The title can also be expanded with the addition of "Yekhe" (meaning "great" or "grand") to produce "Yekhe Khagan", meaning "Great Emperor".

The Mongol Empire began to split politically with the Toluid Civil War during 1260–1264 and the death of Kublai Khan in 1294, but the term Ikh Khagan (Great Khan, or Emperor) was still used by the emperors of the Yuan dynasty (1271–1368), who also took on the title of the Emperor of China. After the fall of the Yuan dynasty, the title continued to be used by monarchs of the Northern Yuan dynasty. 

Thus, the Yuan is sometimes referred to as the Empire of the Great Khan, coexisting with the other independent Mongol-ruled khanates in the west, including the Chagatai Khanate and Golden Horde. Only the Ilkhanate truly recognized the Yuan's overlordship as allies (although it was effectively autonomous). Because Kublai founded the Yuan, the members of the other branches of the Borjigin could take part in the election of a new Khagan as the supporters of one or other of the contestants, but they could not enter the contest as candidates themselves. 

Later, Yuan emperors made peace with the three western khanates of the Mongol Empire and were considered as their nominal suzerain. The nominal supremacy, while based on nothing like the same foundations as that of the earlier Khagans (such as the continued border clashes among them), did last for a few decades, until the Yuan dynasty collapsed in 1368.

After the breakdown of Mongol Empire and the fall of the Yuan dynasty in the mid-14th century, the Mongols turned into a political turmoil. Dayan Khan (1464–1517/1543) once revived the Emperor's authority and recovered its reputation on the Mongolian Plateau, but with the distribution of his empire among his sons and relatives as fiefs it again caused decentralized rule. The last Khagan of the Chahars, Ligdan Khan, died in 1634 while fighting the Jurchen-led Later Jin dynasty. In contemporary Mongolian language the words "Khaan" and "Khan" have different meanings, while English language usually does not differentiate between them. The title is also used as a generic term for a king or emperor (as), as in "" ("king/khaan of Spain Juan Carlos").

The early Khagans of the Mongol Empire were:
 Genghis Khan (1206–1227; 21 years)
 Ögedei Khan (1229–1241; 12 years)
 Güyük Khan (1246–1248; 2 years)
 Möngke Khan (1251–1259; 8 years)

Among Turkic peoples 

The title became associated with the Ashina ruling clan of the Göktürks and their dynastic successors among such peoples as the Khazars (cf. the compound military title Khagan Bek). Minor rulers were rather relegated to the lower title of khan.

Both Khagan as such and the Turkish form Hakan, with the specification in Arabic al-Barrayn wa al-Bahrayn (meaning literally "of both lands and both seas"), or rather fully in Ottoman Turkish Hakan ül-Berreyn vel-Bahreyn, were among the titles in the official full style of the Great Sultan (and later Caliph) of the Ottoman Empire, reflecting the historical legitimation of the dynasty's rule as political successor to various conquered (often Islamised) states. (The title began: Sultan Hân N.N., Padishah, Hünkar, Sovereign of the House of Osman, Sultan of Sultans, Khan of Khans, Commander of the Faithful and Successor of the Prophet of the Lord of the Universe; next followed a series of specifically "regional" titles, starting with Protector of the Holy Cities of Mecca, Medina and Jerusalem.)

"Khagan" is the second title of Safavid and Qajar shahs (kings) of Iran. For example, Agha Muhammad Khan Qajar, Fath Ali Shah and other Qajar shahs used this title. The nickname of Shah Ismail and other Safavid shahs is Kagan-i Suleyman shan (Khagan with the glory of Solomon).

Ottoman Empire 
Ottoman rulers, after the 14th century, used only two titles "shah" and "khan" until end of the empire. Sultans like Mehmed the Conqueror and Suleiman the Magnificent used the title "Khagan of the two seas". Yazıcıoğlu Ali, in early 15th century, traced Osman's genealogy to Oghuz Khagan, the mythical ancestors of Western Turks, through his senior grandson of his senior son, so giving the Ottoman sultans primacy among Turkish monarchs. Though it was not entirely an imitation of Genghis Khanid doctrine, the Oghuz claim to sovereignty followed the same pattern. Bayezid I advanced this claim against Timur, who denigrated the Ottoman lineage.

Chinese Khagans 

Emperor Taizong of Tang was crowned Tian Kehan, or "heavenly Khagan" after defeating the Tujue (Göktürks). A later letter sent by the Tang court to the Yenisei Kirghiz Qaghan explained that "the peoples of the northwest" had requested Tang Taizong to become the "Heavenly Qaghan". The Tang dynasty Chinese Emperors were recognized as Khagans of the Turks at least from 665 to 705; moreover, two appeal letters from the Turkic hybrid rulers, Ashina Qutluγ Ton Tardu in 727, the Yabgu of Tokharistan, and Yina Tudun Qule in 741, the king of Tashkent, addressing Emperor Xuanzong of Tang as Tian Kehan during the Umayyad expansion.

Among the Slavs 

In the early 10th century, the Rus' people employed the title of kagan (or qaghan), reported by the Persian geographer Ahmad ibn Rustah, who wrote between 903 and 913.

It is believed that the tradition endured in the eleventh century, as the metropolitan bishop of Kiev in the Kievan Rus', Hilarion of Kiev, calls both grand prince Vladimir I of Kiev (978–1015) and grand prince Yaroslav the Wise (1019–1054) by the title of kagan, while a graffito on the walls of Saint Sophia's Cathedral gives the same title to the son of Iaroslav, grand prince Sviatoslav II of Kiev (1073–1076).

See also

Notes

References

Citations

Sources 

 Fairbank, John King. The Cambridge History of China . Cambridge University Press, 1978.  web page
 Grousset, René. (1970). The Empire of the Steppes: a History of Central Asia. Translated by Naomi Walford. Rutgers University Press. New Brunswick, New Jersey, U.S.A.Third Paperback printing, 1991.  (casebound);  (pbk).
 Whittow, Mark. The Making of Byzantium, 600–1025, University of California Press, Berkeley, Los Angeles, 1996.
 Xue, Zongzheng (1992). A History of Turks. Beijing: Chinese Social Sciences Press. .
 Zhou, Weizhou [1985] (2006). A History of Tuyuhun. Guilin: Guangxi Normal University Press. .

Further reading 
 

Titles
Ottoman titles
Heads of state
Khazar titles
Royal titles
Noble titles
Lists of khans
Titles of national or ethnic leadership
Mongolian nobility
Chinese royal titles
Titles of the Göktürks